Lucida Mansi (Lucca, c. 1606 – Lucca, c. February 12, 1649) was an Italian noblewoman, and the subject of a legend in the province of Lucca, Italy.
She is of uncertain origins.

Biography
Lucida was married very young to Vincenzo Diversi, who was killed in the early years of their marriage. Made a widow early, she was remarried to the old and very wealthy Gaspare di Nicolao Mansi. The wealthy Mansi family was well-known earlier than the 16th century in much of Europe thanks to their trade in silk . Their marriage was the subject of much gossip, due to their significant age difference, and how much more attractive Lucida was than her husband. Lucida was very vain, and is rumored to have dedicated an entire room in the Villa Mansi to mirrors in order to admire her own appearance.

Lucida died of the plague February 12, 1649, and was laid to rest in the chiesa dei Cappuccini a Lucca, in her family's crypt.

Lucida in legend

Lucida Mansi, the daughter of Lucchese nobles, was said to be very beautiful and very vain. She was so cruel and concerned with the pleasures of the flesh that she killed her husband in order to be free to enjoy her many lovers. The legend states that she killed her lovers after sleeping with them by throwing them down a ditch covered in sharp blades.

1606 births
1649 deaths
Italian nobility
17th-century deaths from plague (disease)
People from Lucca
17th-century Italian women